USS Lexington II (SP-705), later USS SP-705, was an American patrol vessel in commission from 1917 to 1918.

Lexington II was built as a private motorboat of the same name in 1911 by the New York Yacht, Launch & Engine Company at Morris Heights in the Bronx, New York. On 13 July 1917, the U.S. Navy chartered her from her owner, Dale B. Fitler of Philadelphia, Pennsylvania, for use as a section patrol boat during World War I. Delivered to the Navy on 22 July 1917, she was commissioned as USS Lexington II (SP-705) on 23 July 1917 at Camden, New Jersey. She was enrolled in the Naval Coast Defense Reserve on 26 July 1917.

Assigned to the 4th Naval District and based at Philadelphia, Lexington II served on patrol duties for the rest of World War I.  She guarded the submarine nets in the Delaware River and also conducted patrols around Philadelphia, into the lower reaches of the Delaware River to the Delaware Bay, and through the Chesapeake and Delaware Canal to the Chesapeake Bay. She was renamed USS SP-705 sometime in 1918.

SP-705 was decommissioned at Philadelphia on 21 November 1918 and returned to Fitler on 23 November 1918.

Notes

References

SP-705 Lexington II at Department of the Navy Naval History and Heritage Command Online Library of Selected Images: U.S. Navy Ships -- Listed by Hull Number "SP" #s and "ID" #s -- World War I Era Patrol Vessels and other Acquired Ships and Craft numbered from SP-700 through SP-799
NavSource Online: Section Patrol Craft Photo Archive Lexington II (SP 705)

Patrol vessels of the United States Navy
World War I patrol vessels of the United States
Ships built in Morris Heights, Bronx
1911 ships
Ships built by the New York Yacht, Launch & Engine Company